Details of the 2014 All-Ireland Under-21 B Hurling Championship.

Overview

Kerry are the defending champions, having beaten Kildare in the 2013 All-Ireland final.

Fixtures/results

Connacht Under-21 B Hurling Championship

Leinster Under-21 A Hurling Championship

Ulster Under-21 Hurling Shield

All-Ireland Under-21 B Hurling Championship

External links
 All-Ireland Under-21 B Hurling fixtures
 Leinster Under-21 A Hurling Championship fixtures
 Ulster Under-21 Hurling Shield results

References

2014 in hurling